Miriam Leone (born 14 April 1985) is an Italian actress, presenter and model, winner of the Miss Italia beauty contest in 2008.

Biography
Miriam Leone was born in Catania, Sicily, on April 14, 1985. She lived her youth in Acireale, the daughter of a literature teacher, Ignazio Leone, and Gabriella Leotta, employed in the municipality of Aci Catena. She has a younger brother named Sergio. She attended the "Gulli e Pennisi" classical high school in Acireale and at the end of her high school studies enrolled in the Faculty of Letters and Philosophy at the University of Catania, but did not finish her studies.

The young Sicilian participated in the Miss Italy contest in 2008 with the title of "Miss Prima dell'anno". After being initially eliminated during the program, she was subsequently reinstated in the competition and won the "Miss Italia 2008" sash in the final, as well as the title of "Miss Cinema" awarded by Anna Strasberg of the Actors Studio, who also awarded a scholarship.

Leone co-presented Unomattina Estate from 1 June to 11 September on Rai Uno. In 2010 Leone was a judge on Ciak! Si Canta. Since 2010, she has been co-hosting Mattina in famiglia on Rai Uno. She also hosted the Nastro d'Argento award ceremony in 2011.

Leone began her acting career with small roles before obtaining the lead role in television series Distretto di polizia (2011-12), La dama velata (2015) and Non uccidere (2015-18). She played the main role of Veronica Castello in the Sky Atlantic trilogy 1992, 1993 and 1994. In 2018 she starred as the lead in the black comedy film Put Grandma in the Freezer.

Leone starred as Eva Kant in the 2021 film based on the comics series Diabolik.

Filmography

References

External links 

 

1985 births
Living people
Actors from Catania
Italian beauty pageant winners
Italian television presenters
Italian film actresses
Italian stage actresses
Italian female models
Models from Sicily
Italian women television presenters
Mass media people from Catania